Fimat is part of Société Générale Group, and is a subsidiary of Société Générale Securities Services. Fimat Group consists of more than 1,900 staff in 26 market places and is a member of 44 derivatives exchanges and 19 stock exchanges worldwide. In 2006, Fimat achieved a global market share of 6.5% on major derivatives exchanges on which Fimat and its subsidiaries are a member.

Fimat refers to all companies or divisions of companies owned directly or indirectly by Société Générale that include the Fimat name. Only Fimat USA, LLC. and Fimat Preferred is a member of the NASD (National Association of Securities Dealers) and SIPC (Securities Investors Protection Corporation). Fimat International Banque S.A. (UK Branch) is a member of the LSE and does not deal with, or for Private Customers (as defined by the Financial Services Authority). Fimat International Banque SA (Frankfurt Branch) only conducts business with market professionals and institutional customers. Only Fimat Canada Inc. is a member of the CIPF. Not all services are available from all Fimat organizations.

In January 2008, Fimat merged with the futures brokerage unit of Calyon, Crédit Agricole's investment bank, to create Newedge.

See also 
 Commodity markets

References 
 Fimat homepage
 Reference Article

External links
 www.fimat.com
 www.newedgegroup.com

Financial services companies of France
Société Générale